Rocky Knob Recreation Area is a  recreation area along the Blue Ridge Parkway, which spans from mile markers 167–174. The park is home to 15 miles of hiking trails, 81 tents camping sites, 28 RV sites, and 72 picnic sites. The campground is open seasonally, typically from May–October. Rocky Knob is also home to Rock Castle Gorge, a  gorge, and home to the Rock Castle Gorge National Recreation Trail. The trail drops 1,000 feet in elevation in 3 miles, and backpackers can request a backcountry camping permit from the National Park Service.

History
Rocky Knob Recreation area was one of the first of five recreation areas developed along the Blue Ridge Parkway, and is one of the largest recreation areas within the entirety of the park. The backcountry campsite, accessible via a loop trail into the gorge, is on the cite of a former Civilian Conservation Corps (CCC) camp. By the summit of Rocky Knob is a trail shelter, which was one of the first buildings constructed along the entirety of the Parkway.  The shelter was constructed for the Appalachian Trail, which ran through the recreation area until its relocation to Jefferson National Forest in 1952.  The area was a large focus for the CCC, with very ambitions plans, including a swimming pool, a lodge, a car service station, campground, lake, and hiking trails. Only some of these amenities were built. Before the CCC camp closed in 1941, the corps planted several hundred blight resistant Chinese chestnut trees to replace the American versions lost in previous decades.

Trails

 Rock Castle Gorge Trail ( strenuous loop)
 Black Ridge Trail ( moderate loop)
 Rocky Knob Picnic area Trail ( easy loop)

References

Blue Ridge Parkway
Sculpture gardens, trails and parks in the United States
Civilian Conservation Corps
Civilian Conservation Corps in Virginia